Llamayojcasa (possibly from Quechua llama llama, -yuq a suffix, Llamayuq an archaeological site, q'asa mountain pass, "Llamayuq pass" or "mountain pass with llamas"), also known as Qochaqollur (possibly from Quechua for "lake star"), is a mountain in the eastern extensions of the Urubamba mountain range in the Andes of Peru, about  high. It is located in the Cusco Region, Calca Province, Calca District. It lies southeast of Ccerayoc. This is where the archaeological site of Llamayuq is situated.

References 

Mountains of Peru
Mountains of Cusco Region